Émile Maurice Léon Coulonvaux (26 February 1892 – 10 March 1966) was a Belgian liberal lawyer and politician. Coulonvaux was doctor in law and a lawyer. He became an alderman (1927–1928) in Dinant and was also liberal senator (1939–1946 and 1949–1961) and President of the Liberal Party in 1937–1940.

Sources

 Presidents of the Belgian liberal party

1892 births
1966 deaths

Belgian politicians
Walloon people
Walloon movement activists
People from Chimay